People of Faith Against the Death Penalty (PFADP) is a nonpartisan, nonprofit, interfaith non-governmental organization whose mission and purpose is to educate and mobilize faith communities to act to abolish the death penalty in the United States of America. It focuses on organizing among faith communities in the South, where most executions take place. It was founded in 1994 in North Carolina.

People of Faith Against Death Penalty is one of 121 member organizations of the World Coalition Against the Death Penalty, whose mission is to strengthen the international dimensions of the fight against the death penalty and, ultimately, to obtain the universal abolition of the death penalty.

A prominent member of PFADP was the late Dean Smith, Basketball Hall of Fame head coach of the University of North Carolina Tar Heels. Smith was part of a 1998 delegation that confronted then-Governor of North Carolina Jim Hunt, with Smith quietly calling Huntand everyone else in the room, including Smitha "murderer" for allowing capital punishment to take place.

References 

Interfaith organizations
Anti–death penalty organizations in the United States
Religious organizations based in the United States
Organizations established in 1994
1994 establishments in North Carolina